Adam Bly (born 1981 in Montreal, Quebec) is a Canadian scientist and entrepreneur. He is the creator of Seed and used to lead data at Spotify until he left in 2017. Bly joined Spotify in 2015 when Spotify acquired his company, Seed Scientific. He was a Visiting Senior Fellow in Science, Technology, and Society at Harvard Kennedy School. In 2007, he was named a Young Global Leader by the World Economic Forum. He is a recipient of the Queen Elizabeth II Golden Jubilee Medal.

Life and work
He began his career at the age of 16 as the youngest researcher at the National Research Council of Canada, where he spent three years studying the biochemistry of cancer, specifically the role of cell adhesion in metastasis. Out of the lab, without completing a university education, he founded Seed – tag-lined "Science is Culture™" – and served as its Editor-in-Chief. "The best comparison for Seed," wrote a media critic at the time of the magazine's launch in 2001, "is the early years of Rolling Stone, when music was less a subject than a lens for viewing culture." Under his leadership, the magazine earned critical acclaim for modernizing scientific publishing and for bridging long-standing divides between science and society – from art and design to politics and religion. Together with Paola Antonelli he co-founded a monthly gathering of scientists, architects, and designers that laid the foundation for Design and the Elastic Mind, an exhibition about science and design at The Museum of Modern Art.

He is the editor of Science is Culture: Conversations at the New Intersection of Science + Society (published by HarperCollins) and the creator of the data visualization platform Visualizing.org.

He has lectured around the world on the future of science and its role in society, including at the World Economic Forum, the National Academies of Science, the Royal Society, the National Institutes of Health, the State Department, NASA, the Chinese Ministry of Science and Technology, The Museum of Modern Art, and The Academy of Sciences for the Developing World, before the National Science Board and the U.S. House of Representatives, and at universities including Harvard, MIT, and Beijing. He has served on the nominating committees and juries of the Buckminster Fuller Challenge, the Earth Award, and the TED Prize, and sits on the Science Advisory Committee of the World Economic Forum, the External Advisory Board of the University of Michigan's Risk Science Center, the American Committee of the Weizmann Institute of Science, the Communications Advisory Board of the National Academy of Sciences, and as an advisor to OECD's Global Project on Measuring the Progress of Societies.

He was named Vice Chair of the World Economic Forum's Global Agenda Council on Design Innovation and Partner to the Executive Coordination Office for the Rio+20 United Nations Conference on Sustainable Development.

His achievements were highlighted by then-Canadian Prime Minister Jean Chrétien, "for showing people the scope and power of science not just as an object of study but as a key to understanding the world around us."

References

External links
Video interview at Big Think
Gaining understanding from data visualization
Guardian talk
Making Open Science Real
About Seed

1981 births
Living people
American magazine editors
Canadian media executives
Canadian magazine editors
Scientists from Montreal